Labeo lualabaensis is fish in genus Labeo from the Congo Basin.

References 

Labeo
Cyprinid fish of Africa
Taxa named by Sinaseli-Marcel Tshibwabwa
Fish described in 1997
Endemic fauna of the Democratic Republic of the Congo